Vernon Jacobs Brown (March 20, 1874April 8, 1964) was the 46th lieutenant governor of Michigan.

Early life 
Brown was born to parents John Madison and Nancy Brown on March 20, 1874 in Vevay, Ingham County, Michigan. Brown attended high school in Mason, Michigan.

Career 
In 1905, Brown worked as a farmer. In his first political job, Brown served as Vevay Township clerk in Ingham County, Michigan, at the age of 21. He held numerous other local elected positions, including Ingham County Clerk from 1919 until 1922. After this, he purchased Ingham County News and became editor and publisher. Brown continued his political career was then elected to the Michigan House of Representatives from the 2nd District of Ingham County on November 6, 1928. He was sworn in on January 2, 1929. He would serve in this legislative body until 1938. Brown then served as Michigan Auditor General from 1938 to 1944. After this, Brown was elected to the position of Lieutenant Governor of Michigan alongside Michigan Governor Harry Kelly. After his term as Lieutenant Governor, Brown ran for the governorship in the Republican primary for the 1946 gubernatorial election, but was unsuccessful.

Associations 
Brown was a member of the Freemasons, the Kiwanis, and was in the Benevolent and Protective Order of Elks. Brown was Presbyterian.

Death 
Brown died on April 8, 1964 in Webberville, Michigan.

References 

1874 births
1964 deaths
American Freemasons
Lieutenant Governors of Michigan
Republican Party members of the Michigan House of Representatives
Michigan Auditors General
Farmers from Michigan
Presbyterians from Michigan
People from Ingham County, Michigan
Burials in Michigan
20th-century American politicians